Bancroft Township may refer to:

 Bancroft Township, Freeborn County, Minnesota
 Bancroft Township, Cuming County, Nebraska

Township name disambiguation pages